The Western Promenade is a historic promenade, an  public park and recreation area in the  West End neighborhood of Portland, Maine.  Developed between 1836 and the early 20th century, it is one Portland's oldest preserved spaces, with landscaping by the Olmsted Brothers, who included it in their master plan for the city's parks.  The promenade was listed on the National Register of Historic Places in 1989.

Description and history
The Western Promenade occupies land overlooking a bluff on the west side of the Portland peninsula. It is bounded on the north by the Maine Medical Center complex, the east by the Western Cemetery and a historic 19th-century residential neighborhood (listed on the National Register as the Western Promenade Historic District), and the west by Valley Street. The park provides views to the west which include the White Mountains of New Hampshire. The steep slope of the bluff is wooded, except for a section near West Street where a trail is cut down to Valley Street. The network of trails on the bluff is essentially that laid out by John C. Olmsted in 1905.

The city began acquiring land on the peninsula's western bluff as early as 1836, since it had long been recognized for its scenery and views, and there was public pressure for increased open space on the increasingly urbanized peninsula.  At some point a tree-lined drive was built along the bluff.  Beginning in the late 1870s, city engineer William Goodwin championed efforts to further improve the park.  In the 1890s and 1900s, Mayor James Phinney Baxter engineered the expansion of the park to its present dimensions, and hired the Olmsted Brothers to oversee a landscaping plan for the park, and to develop a master plan for the city's parks.  Design work on the Western Promenade is credited to John C. Olmsted and Henry Vincent Hubbard, then an apprentice with the Olmsted firm.

Western Promenade Neighborhood
The name Western Promenade also the neighborhood adjacent to the park itself. In the nineteenth century, the land was owned by industrialist John Bundy Brown, who was one of the wealthiest men in Maine. He owned a sugar refinery (the Portland Sugar Company) in which a mainly Irish immigrant workforce refined molasses into raw granulated sugar. After his death, the land was sold parcel by parcel and the present neighborhood was built. It is home to a significant number of mansions and historic homes originally built for Portland's wealthiest and most powerful residents. The Western Promenade Historic District encompasses many of the homes in the neighborhood. 

The Western Promenade Neighborhood Association was founded in 1973 and describes itself as "dedicated to the uplifting, improvement, beautification, home security, and preservation of the Bramhall Hill section of Portland with particular interest in the historical and cultural nature of the neighborhood." As of 2021, its president is former mayor Anne Pringle.

Gallery

See also
National Register of Historic Places listings in Portland, Maine

References

Parks in Portland, Maine
National Register of Historic Places in Maine
Public art in Portland, Maine
History of Portland, Maine
Streets in Portland, Maine
West End (Portland, Maine)
National Register of Historic Places in Portland, Maine
Parks on the National Register of Historic Places in Maine